Per Rickard Henrik Andreasson (born 18 February 1981 in Mariefred) is a Swedish Drummer, Rocksinger and Songwriter.  He is co-founder of the Swedish rock-band Royal Republic.

Career 
Per Andreasson studied Music at the Malmö Academy of Music. In 2007 he founded the band "Royal Republic" along with three other students Adam Grahn (vocals, guitar), Jonas Almén (bass) and Hannes Irengård (guitar). The band recorded their first album, We are the Royal in 2010 in Malmö. In 2012 they released their second album titled Save the Nation. The third album Royal Republic and the Nosebreakers with songs from the previous albums re-interpreted in an acoustic and country-like way was released in 2014. In 2016 the Swedes recorded their fourth album "Weekendman". Last three albums were recorded by Michael Ilbert at Hansa Studio 1 and Hansa Mix Room. The band has signed a contract with Vertigo/Universal Music. Royal Republic are active on the touring circuit in Europe and the United States.
The band played at the tradition-rich German festivals Rock am Ring, Rock im Park and the Highfield-Festival.

Other activities

Classical Artist/Classical Composer: Per Andreasson is the composer of percussion quartet Tin-Play.
Classical Soloist: Per Andreasson has a master of classical percussion. He performed as Soloist on classic percussion pieces as: Night of the Moon Dances, Twilight, Mudra
Rednex: He briefly played drums for Rednex.

Discography

see Royal Republic Discography

References

External links

 Per Andreasson Officiell website

Royal Republic
Swedish drummers
Swedish rock singers
Swedish composers
Swedish male composers
Living people
Musicians from Malmö
1981 births
21st-century drummers